The escudo was the currency of Portuguese Timor between 1959 and 1976. It replaced the pataca at a rate of 5.6 escudos = 1 pataca and was equivalent to the Portuguese escudo. It was replaced by the Indonesian rupiah at an unknown exchange rate following East Timor's occupation by Indonesia. The escudo was subdivided into  100 centavos.

East Timor (formerly Portuguese Timor) now uses the United States dollar banknotes and has its own coins in circulation.

Coins
The first coins issued, dated 1958, were in denominations of 10, 30 and 60 centavos, 1, 3 and 6 escudos. The unusual denominations (see also the banknotes, below) may have been due to the exchange rate from the previous currency. The 10 and 30 centavos were struck in bronze, the 60 centavos and 1 escudo in cupro-nickel, and the 3 and 6 escudos in silver. In 1964, a silver 10 escudos was introduced, followed, in 1970, by more conventional denominations of 20 and 50 centavos, 1, 5 and 10 escudos. The 20 and 50 centavos and 1 escudo were struck in bronze, with the higher denominations struck in cupro-nickel.

Banknotes
The first banknotes, dated 1959, were in denominations of 30, 60, 100 and 500 escudos. In 1967, 20 and 50 escudos notes were introduced, followed by 1000 escudos in 1968. All paper money was issued by the Banco Nacional Ultramarino.

See also

Cifrão

References

Currencies of East Timor
Economy of East Timor
Portuguese Timor
Modern obsolete currencies
Economic history of Portugal
1959 establishments in Portuguese Timor
1976 disestablishments
Escudo